The 1903 Baylor football team was an American football team that represented Baylor University as an independent during the 1903 college football season. In its first season under head coach R. N. Watts, the team compiled a 4–3–1 record and was outscored by a total of 69 to 46.

Schedule

Season summary
In October, coach Watts also acted as referee for the Vanderbilt at Texas game.

Oct. 3 vs. TCU
Opening the local football season, Baylor defeated TCU in front of a large crowd on the former's campus; a street railway strike forced many spectators to arrive by less conventional means, such as hay wagons.

vs. Texas
Following the wins against Texas Christian University and Fort Worth University, Baylor was considered a strong contender for the state championship if the team could win the game against Texas.  Although Texas won, the team's captain, Rembert Watson was injured and missed Texas's next game against Arkansas.

Nov. 7 vs. Texas A&M
The game "was the hardest fought game ever played at Waco," and while A&M held the advantage, they could not score before time ended each half.

References

Baylor
Baylor Bears football seasons
Baylor football